William Oliver Fulton (24 February 1891 – 27 August 1975) was an Australian politician.

He was born in Mooroopna to butcher George Fulton and Caroline Eatwell. Educated locally, he became a blacksmith at Charlton and Wonthaggi, and served with the 13th Light Horse Regiment in World War I. On 24 April 1915 he married Mary Emma Lancaster, with whom he had five children. In 1921 he settled at Maffra, where he became a manufacturer of agricultural implements. In 1942 he was elected to the Victorian Legislative Assembly as the Country Party member for Gippsland North. Defeated in 1945, he was returned in 1947. In 1950 he was appointed Minister of Health in the Country Party government, but he lost his seat in 1952. In 1953 he won a by-election for Gippsland Province in the Victorian Legislative Council, where he served until his retirement in 1964. In June 1955 he had married Marjorie Beryl Moss, née Cowden. Fulton died in Maffra in 1975.

References

1891 births
1975 deaths
National Party of Australia members of the Parliament of Victoria
Members of the Victorian Legislative Assembly
Members of the Victorian Legislative Council
20th-century Australian politicians
People from Mooroopna